Humanism may refer to ethical philosophies such as

 Religious humanism, an integration of humanist ethical philosophy with religious rituals and beliefs
 Christian humanism, a philosophy that combines Christian ethics and humanist principles
 Humanistic Judaism, a movement in Judaism that offers a nontheistic alternative in contemporary Jewish life
 Secular humanism, embraces humanism while rejecting religious aspects

Humanism may also refer to:
 Renaissance humanism, an intellectual movement based on reviving Greek and Roman knowledge
 Classical humanism, the cultivation of Greco-Roman legacies (not limited to Renaissance times)
 Civic Humanism, a form of republicanism inspired by the writings of classical antiquity
 Humanism (philosophy of education), a theory based on generation of knowledge, meaning and expertise
 Humanities, a group of academic disciplines and the educational philosophy associated with them
 Pragmatism, in the terminology of F.S.C. Schiller
 Marxist Humanism, a more liberal form of Marxism
 Neohumanism, a holistic philosophical theory elaborated by Prabhat Ranjan Sarkar
 New Humanism (disambiguation), a literary criticism term associated with Irving Babbitt and Paul Elmer More

See also
 Humanism
 Humanist (disambiguation)